The 2010 Brooklyn/Queens tornadoes were a severe weather event that occurred in the boroughs of Brooklyn and Queens in New York City on September 16, 2010. These tornadoes were the second and third to touch down in New York City that year, the first having occurred in the Bronx on July 25.

Summary
The storms struck New York City just as the evening rush hour was beginning. Damaging winds, heavy downpours, and hail up to  wreaked havoc with the evening commute.

A woman was killed when a tree fell and crushed the vehicle she was driving. Another man in Flushing was killed by a tree crashing into his home by Kissena Park. Extensive and widespread wind damage led to over 30,000 downed trees, and power lines. According to Con Edison, more than 25,000 customers lost power in Queens while 5,000 were without power in Staten Island. Four buildings across Brooklyn and Queens reported experiencing a partial collapse due to tornadic winds. The worst damage was concentrated in the neighborhoods of Middle Village, Forest Hills, and Bayside in Queens as well as Park Slope and Bed-Stuy in Brooklyn. Scattered power outages were reported across parts of the city.

Two separate tornadoes were later confirmed in Park Slope and Flushing, two areas that suffered the worst damage from the storms. The stronger of the two tornadoes touched down over Flushing and was rated an EF1 with maximum winds of 100 mph. The tornado touched down in Flushing Meadows Corona Park and headed through Northeast Queens, dissipating over Little Neck Bay. The twister tore down the 150-year-old steeple of St. George's Church in downtown Flushing. In Forest Hills, a group of trees were knocked over in MacDonald park, destroying the park and surroundings. Combined, the two tornadoes caused $25.7 million in damages.

These tornadoes were part of a small outbreak that produced several damaging tornadoes across the Midwest, especially in Ohio. An EF2 tornado caused severe damage, totaling $35 million, near Wooster, Ohio. Another strong EF3 tornado that destroyed numerous homes near Reedsville, Ohio and Belleville, West Virginia killed one person and injured several more. This became the first fatal tornado in West Virginia in a decade. The stadium at Athens High School was destroyed by a tornado.

Confirmed tornadoes

References

External links 

 Tornadoes in the New York Metropolitan Region: Climatology and Multiscale Analysis of Two Events
 Tornado Hits Queens College
 Park Slope Tornado -- 9.16.10 (Brooklyn, NY)
 Tornado Rips Through NYC (Bayside, NY) - Sept 16th 2010

2010s in Brooklyn
2010s in Queens
Brooklyn,09-16
Natural disasters in New York City
Tornadoes in New York (state)
Brooklyn Queens tornadoes
Brooklyn Queens tornadoes
Brooklyn Queens tornadoes